WEG is a Brazilian company, operating worldwide in the electric engineering, power and automation technology areas. Headquartered in Jaraguá do Sul, Brazil, the company produces electric motors, generators, transformers, drives and coatings. WEG has operations in around 100 countries, with approximately 31,000 employees (2014).

History 

The company Eletromotores Jaraguá was created on 16 September 1961 by Werner Ricardo Voigt, Eggon João da Silva and Geraldo Werninghaus (respectively an electrician, an administrator and a mechanic). Years later changed its name to Eletromotores WEG SA, the name WEG being formed with the first letter of each founder's first name.

Initially producing electric motors, WEG started diversifying its activities during the eighties, with the production of electric components, products for industrial automation, power and distribution transformers, liquid and powder paints and electrical insulation varnishes. The company grew into a global motor manufacturer.

In 1968, WEG created CentroWEG, a training center to aid in the lack of qualified professionals in the area of mechanical engineers.

In May 2008, WEG announced a new factory in India.

In February 2012, the Canadian manufacturer Ballard Power Systems signed a deal with WEG to assess the market opportunities for hydrogen PEM fuel cell products and services in applications.

In February 2019, WEG acquired Energy Storage System, the storage business of US-based Northern Power Systems (NPS). WEG had previously bought the utility-scale turbine business of NPS in 2016. In May 2019, WEG signed a deal with the aerospace conglomerate Embraer to work on new electrical propulsion systems for aircraft.

In May 2019, WEG also introduced the 4MW wind turbine, its biggest machine so far.

Activities

Description 
The company has subsidiaries in 29 countries and production is distributed in manufacturing plants in 12 countries such as Brazil, Argentina, Mexico, Portugal, China, South Africa and in the United States.

Products 
 Generation (Generators, turbines)
 Transmission (EPC, switchgear, transformers)
 Distribution (EPC, transformers)
 Electric products (motors, switchgear, frequency inverters, AC/DC converters, contactors, fuses, circuit breakers and servomotors, etc.)
 Automation (Hardware and Software)
 Integration Engineering with products of different manufacturers

References

External links
 Official site
 WEG no LinkedIn  

Electrical engineering companies
Engineering companies of Brazil
Manufacturing companies of Brazil
Companies based in Santa Catarina (state)
Manufacturing companies established in 1961
Defence companies of Brazil
Companies listed on B3 (stock exchange)
Brazilian brands
1961 establishments in Brazil
Multinational companies headquartered in Brazil